Akalanka Buddhika Uditha Dedduwa Pathirana (born 17 March 1974) who was a Deputy Minister of Ministry of Industry and Commerce කර්මාන්ත හා වාණිජ කටයුතු  in  Sri Lanka and a Member of the 7th Parliament of Sri Lanka represented the United National Party (UNP), for Matara District. He was elected to the Parliament at the General Election held on 8 April 2010 winning the second highest percentage of votes from the United National Party which is the major opposition in the country.

Education 

Pathirana received his primary and secondary education from Rahula College, Matara (1980–1993). He was a senior school prefect, captain of the debating team and was awarded the President Scout Medal. He is a Pre Intern Medical Doctor Faculty of Medicine, University of Kelaniya, Sri Lanka. (1997-2002)

Professional career 

Pathirana joined the Telshan Network Pvt. Ltd (TNL TV) in 1995 as an Assistant News Coordinator and worked there till 1998 as a News Coordinator, the Deputy News Editor and a Political Programme Presenter. From 1998 to 2004, he served at MTV Channel Private Ltd (Sirasa TV) as a Political Programme Presenter and an Executive Producer.

Political career 

After receiving 44,165 preferential votes at the Provincial Council Elections in 2004, Pathirana became a member of the Southern Provincial Council. He also became the youngest leader of the opposition in Provincial Councils in Sri Lanka when he was appointed as the leader of the opposition in Southern Provincial Council in 2009, with 57,802 votes. He entered into the 7th Parliament of Sri Lanka as a member by receiving 62,499 preferential votes from Matara District at the General Election in 2010. Pathirana is a member of 14 Consultative Committees inclusive of Ministries of Economic Development, Ports & Aviation, Fisheries & Aquatic Resources, State Defense, etc. He was awarded as the Most Outstanding Young Politician in Sri Lanka in 2006. He has been working as the Media Secretary of the UNP for Southern Province since 2004 and the Chief Organiser of the UNP in Akuressa Electorate since 2005.

International Accolades 

Pathirana was elected as a member of the executive committee and the chief executive officer for South Asia in Young Liberals and Democrats of Asia (YLDA) in 2007 and 2008 respectively.

Other Positions

Pathirana was the first chairman of Mutuhara Children's Society (1987–1990). He was the first District Secretary for Youth Red Cross Society (1990–1992). He was the youngest Principal of Sunday schools in Sri Lanka from 1991 to 1998. He has been the Chief Basnayaka Nilame for Matara Binara Maha Perahera since 2007. He was National Chairman of Liberal Youth Guilds (LYG) in Sri Lanka (2007–2009). Pathirana is the Founder, chairman and the managing director of the Samadhi Community Development Foundation, since 2000.

References

External links

Between pluses and minuses

Alumni of Rahula College
Living people
1974 births
Members of the 14th Parliament of Sri Lanka
Members of the 15th Parliament of Sri Lanka
Members of the 16th Parliament of Sri Lanka
Samagi Jana Balawegaya politicians